The 1931 Southwest Texas State Bobcats football team was an American football team that represented Southwest Texas State Teachers College (now known as Texas State University) during the 1931 college football season as a member of the Texas Intercollegiate Athletic Association (TIAA). In their 13th year under head coach Oscar W. Strahan, the team compiled an overall record of 4–4 with a mark of 2–3 in conference play.

Schedule

References

Southwest Texas State
Texas State Bobcats football seasons
Southwest Texas State Bobcats football